One (stylized as ONE) or Tomohiro is the pseudonym of a Japanese manga artist, who is best known for his web manga series One-Punch Man, which was later remade into a digital manga illustrated by Yusuke Murata. One serializes the One-Punch Man webcomic on his own website under no official publisher, while the manga remake is serialized in the web version of Weekly Young Jump. His other well-known series, Mob Psycho 100, was serialized in the online version of Weekly Shōnen Sunday, Ura Sunday.

Biography

Early life
One was born in Niigata and grew up in Saitama. While visiting his grandparents in Niigata, his parents bought him a series of manga called Crayon Shin-chan by Yoshito Usui. One was a fan of the manga, which influenced his decision to become a manga artist, and began practising on his notebook during middle and high school.

Career
In July 2009, One began publishing a short version of One-Punch Man in Shintosha, a comic-posting website. He later began irregularly uploading One-Punch Man to his web page FC2 on July 3, 2009. Originally, One-Punch Man was intended to be a one-off to further practice drawing, but became a series following positive reception. Due to its humorous setting and story, One-Punch Man became popular in Japan.  One had a special interest in creating a protagonist that had already become the strongest in the world, which enabled him to concentrate on a different perspective of the background and storytelling. One stated that he envisioned the protagonist, Saitama, as a character capable of adapting to the world that surrounded him, with his primary obstacles being mundane things. Before One decided to become a full-time manga artist, he had taken several hiatuses from updating the webcomic, including a one-year hiatus in February 2010 to work at a full-time job, and a two-year hiatus after releasing the 109th chapter in January 2017. 
 
Manga artist Yusuke Murata was interested in One's work and eventually reached out to One. The two would collaborate in publishing two one-shots in 2012; Dotō no Yūshatachi, which released on April 1 in Weekly Young Jump, and Dangan Tenshi Fan Club, which released on April 17 in Miracle Jump. A remake of One-Punch Man  began serialization in Shueisha's Tonari no Young Jump website on June 14, 2012. One-Punch Man would also receive an anime adaptation, announced in the 15th issue of Weekly Young Jump on March 10, 2015. The first season aired in Japan from October 5 to December 21, 2015, with live-action film adaptation also in development. The same year, One wrote and illustrated Mob Psycho 100, which began serialization in Shogakukan's Ura Sunday webcomic magazine on April 18, 2012. The protagonist, Shigeo Kageyama, is meant to come off as "somewhat standoffish or nerdy," while also possessing heroic traits. The series finished on December 22, 2017. On November 26, 2022, Versus began serialization in Kodansha's Shonen Sirius magazine, written by One and illustrated by  Kyōtarō Azuma.

Works

Awards and nominations

References

External links
 
 

Living people
Manga artists from Saitama Prefecture
Pseudonymous artists
One-Punch Man
Japanese webcomic creators
Anonymous artists
Year of birth missing (living people)